Tânia Maria Rego Alves (born September 12, 1953 in Bonito de Santa Fé) is a Brazilian actress, dancer, singer and businesswoman.

Her most recent work was the telenovela Araguaia, Walther Negrão, Rede Globo.

She also acts as an entrepreneur since 1999 and is the mother of actress Gabriela Alves, with whom he shares the administration of a spa in Nova Friburgo.

Career

In television 
 1981 – Morte e Vida Severina – dam
 1982 – Estúdio A... Gildo
 1982 – Lampião e Maria Bonita – Maria Bonita
 1983 – Bandidos da Falange – Glória
 1985 – Tenda dos Milagres – Ana Mercedes
 1985 – Ti Ti Ti – Clotilde
 1990 – Pantanal – Filó
 1992 – Pedra sobre Pedra – Lola
 1993 – Você Decide (episode: Chofer de Táxi)
 1995 – Tocaia Grande – Julia Saruê
 1997 – Mandacaru – Severina Dantas
 1998 – Brida – Mercedes
 2000 – Marcas da Paixão – Zefinha
 2001 – A Grande Família (episode: A Desquitada da Freguesia) – Terezinha
 2001 – O Clone – Norma
 2005 – Essas Mulheres – Firmina Mascarenhas
 2007 – Amazônia, de Galvez a Chico Mendes – Dos Anjos
 2010 – Araguaia – Pérola
 2011 – Laços de Sangue

At the movies 
 1976 – Trem Fantasma
 1977 – Morte e Vida Severina
 1977 – Emanuelle Tropical
 1979 – Bachianas Brasileiras: Meu Nome É Villa-Lobos
 1979 – Loucuras, o Bumbum de Ouro
 1981 – O Olho Mágico do Amor – Penélope
 1982 – Cabaret Mineiro
 1983 – Onda Nova
 1983 – O Cangaceiro Trapalhão – Maria Bonita
 1983 – Parahyba Mulher Macho – Anayde Beiriz
 1983 – O Mágico e o Delegado – Paloma
 1984 – Sole nudo – Regina
 1985 – Ópera do Malandro
 1990 – Lambada
 1991 – A República dos Anjos
 1998 – A Hora Mágica – Lília Cantarelli

References

External links 

1953 births
Living people
20th-century Brazilian women singers
20th-century Brazilian singers
Brazilian telenovela actresses
Brazilian film actresses
Brazilian stage actresses